The 2016 Northwestern Wildcats football team represented Northwestern University during the 2016 NCAA Division I FBS football season. They were led by Pat Fitzgerald who is in his 11th season as the team's head coach. The Wildcats home games were played at Ryan Field in Evanston, Illinois. They were members of the West Division of the Big Ten Conference.

Schedule
Northwestern announced its 2016 football schedule on July 11, 2013. The 2016 schedule consists of 7 home and 5 away games in the regular season. The Wildcats will host Big Ten foes Illinois, Indiana, Nebraska, and Wisconsin, and will travel to Iowa, Michigan State, Minnesota, Ohio State, and Purdue.

The team will host all three non–conference games which are against the Duke Blue Devils from the Atlantic Coast Conference (ACC), Illinois State Redbirds from the Missouri Valley Conference, and the Western Michigan Broncos from the Mid-American Conference (MAC).

Schedule Source:

Game summaries

Western Michigan

Illinois State

Duke

Nebraska

at Iowa

at Michigan State

Indiana

at Ohio State

Wisconsin

at Purdue

at Minnesota

Illinois

Pittsburgh–Pinstripe Bowl

Roster

Awards and honors

References

Northwestern
Northwestern Wildcats football seasons
Pinstripe Bowl champion seasons
Northwestern Wildcats football